A floppy disk is a disk storage medium composed of a disk of thin and flexible magnetic storage medium encased in a rectangular plastic carrier. It is read and written using a floppy disk drive (FDD). Floppy disks were an almost universal data format from the 1970s into the 1990s, used for primary data storage as well as for backup and data transfers between computers.

In 1967, at an IBM facility in San Jose (CA), work began on a drive that led to the world's first floppy disk and disk drive. It was introduced into the market in an  format in 1971. The more conveniently sized 5¼-inch disks were introduced in 1976, and became almost universal on dedicated word processing systems and personal computers. This format was more slowly replaced by the 3½-inch format, first introduced in 1982. There was a significant period where both were popular. A number of other variant sizes were introduced over time, with limited market success.

Floppy disks remained a popular medium for nearly 40 years, but their use was declining by the mid- to late 1990s. The introduction of high speed computer networking and formats based on the new NAND flash technique (like USB flash drives and memory cards) led to the eventual disappearance of the floppy disk as a standard feature of microcomputers, with a notable point in this conversion being the introduction of the floppy-less iMac in 1998. After 2000, floppy disks were increasingly rare and used primarily with older hardware and especially with legacy industrial computer equipment.

The 8-inch disk 

IBM's decision in the late 1960s to use semiconductor memory as the writeable control store for future systems and control units created a requirement for an inexpensive and reliable read only device and associated medium to store and ship the control store's microprogram and at system power on to load the microprogram into the control store.  The objective was a read only device costing less than $200 and medium costing less than $5.

IBM San Jose's Direct Access Storage Product Manager, Alan Shugart, assigned the job to David L. Noble, who tried to develop a new-style tape for the purpose, but without success. The project was reassigned to Donald L. Wartner, 23FD Disk Drive manager, and Herbert E. Thompson, 23FD Disk manager, along with design engineers Warren L. Dalziel, Jay Brent Nilson, and Ralph Flores; and that team developed the IBM 23FD Floppy Disk Drive System (code name Minnow). The disk is a read-only,  flexible diskette called the "memory disk" and holding 80 kilobytes of data. Initially the disk was bare, but dirt became a serious problem so they enclosed it in a plastic envelope lined with fabric that would remove dust particles. The Floppy Disk Patent #3,668,658 was issued on June 6, 1972, with named inventors Ralph Flores and Herbert E. Thompson. The Floppy Disk Drive Patent #3,678,481 was issued July 18, 1972 with named inventors Warren L. Dalziel, Jay. B. Nilson, and Donald L. Wartner. IBM introduced the diskette commercially in 1971.

The new device first shipped in 1971 as the 23FD, the control store load device of the 2835 Storage Control Unit. and then as a standard part of most System 370 processing units and other IBM products. Internally IBM used another device, code named Mackerel, to write floppy disks for distribution to the field.

Other suppliers recognized the opportunity for a read/write FDD in applications such as key entry and data logging.    Shugart, by then at Memorex shipped the Memorex 650 in 1972, the first commercially available read-write floppy disk drive. The 650 had a data capacity of 175 kB, with 50 tracks and 8 sectors per track. The Memorex disk was hard sectored, that is, it contained 8 sector holes (plus one index hole) at the outer diameter (outside data track 00) to synchronize the beginning of each data sector and the beginning of a track. Most early 8" disks were hard sectored, meaning that they had a fixed number of disk sectors (usually 8, 16, or 32), marked by physical holes punched around the disk hub, and the drive required the correct media type for its controller.

IBM was developing a read/write FDD but did not see a market opportunity  for such a device so came close to cancelling the project.  A chance encounter in San Jose between IBM's Jack Harker and Don Stephenson the site manager of IBM's General Systems Division, Rochester MN, who needed  a product to compete with Mohawk's key to tape system led to the production of IBM's first read/write FDD, the 33FD code named "IGAR." The 33FD first shipped in May 1973 as a component of the 3740 Data Entry System,  designed to directly replace IBM's punched card ("keypunch") data entry machines. The medium sold separately as "Diskette 1". The new system used a soft sector recording format that stored nearly 250 kB on a disk.  Drives supporting this format were offered by a number of manufacturers and soon became common for moving smaller amounts of data. This disk format became known as the Single Sided Single Density or SSSD format. It was designed to hold the same amount of data as 3000 punch cards. 

In 1973, Shugart founded Shugart Associates which went on to become the dominant manufacturer of 8-inch floppy disk drives. Its SA800 became the industry standard for form factor and interface.

In 1976, media supplier Information Terminals Corporation enhanced resilience further by adding a Teflon coating to the magnetic disk itself.

When the first microcomputers were being developed in the 1970s, the 8-inch floppy found a place on them as one of the few "high speed, mass storage" devices that were even remotely affordable to the target market (individuals and small businesses). The first microcomputer operating system, CP/M, originally shipped on 8-inch disks. However, the drives were still expensive, typically costing more than the computer they were attached to in early days, so most machines of the era used cassette tape instead.

In 1976, IBM introduced the 500 KB Double Sided Single Density (DSSD) format, and in 1977 IBM introduced the 1–1.2 MB Double Sided Double Density (DSDD) format.

Other 8-inch floppy disk formats such as the Burroughs 1 MB unit failed to achieve any market presence.

At the end of 1978 the typical floppy disk price per piece was $5 to $8.  Sales in 1978 for all types of drives and media were expected to reach $135 million for media and $875 million for drives.

The 8" floppy disk drive interface standard as developed from the Shugart Associates drives involved a 50-pin interface and a spindle motor that ran directly from the A/C line and spun constantly. Other later models used a DC motor with corresponding changes to the interface to start and stop the motor.

The 5¼-inch minifloppy 

In a 1976 meeting, An Wang of Wang Laboratories informed Jim Adkisson and Don Massaro of Shugart Associates that the 8-inch format was simply too large and expensive for the desktop word processing machines he was developing at the time, and argued for a US$100 drive.

According to Massaro, Adkisson proposed a smaller size and began working with cardboard mockups before the Wang meeting. George Sollman suggests the size was the average of existing tape drives of the era. It is an urban legend that the physical size came about when they met with Wang at a bar in Boston; when he was asked what size would be appropriate, Wang pointed to a cocktail napkin—there was no such meeting.

The new drive of this size stored 98.5 KB, later increased to 110 KB by adding five tracks.
The 5¼ drive was considerably less expensive than 8-inch drives, and soon started appearing on CP/M machines.

Shugart's initial 5.25" drive was the 35-track, single-sided SA-400, which was widely used in many early microcomputers, and which introduced the 34-pin interface that would become an industry standard. It could be used with either a hard or soft sectored controller, and storage capacity was listed as 90k (single density) or 113k (double density). The drive went on sale in late 1976 at a list price of $400, with a box of ten disks at $60. The new, smaller disk format was taken up quickly, and by 1978 ten different manufacturers were producing 5¼-inch drives. At one point, Shugart was producing 4,000 drives a day, but their ascendancy was short-lived; the company's fortunes declined in the early 1980s. Part of this was due to their failure to develop a reliable 80-track drive, increasing competition, and the loss of several lucrative contracts—Apple by 1982 had switched to using cheaper Alps drive mechanisms in their computers, and IBM chose Tandon as their sole supplier of disk drives for the PC. By 1977 Shugart had been purchased by Xerox, who closed the operations in 1985 and sold the brand to a third party.

In 1978 I.T.C. (later called Verbatim), had approximately 35 percent of the estimated $135 million floppy disk market and sold 5¼-inch disks in large quantities for $1.50 each.

Apple purchased bare SA-400 drive mechanisms for their Disk II drive, which was then equipped with a custom Apple controller board and the faceplate stamped with the Apple logo. Steve Wozniak developed a recording scheme known as Group Coded Recording which allowed 140k of storage, well above the standard 90–113k, although the price of double density controllers fell not long after the Disk II's introduction. GCR recording used software means of detecting the track and sector being accessed, hence there was no need of hard sectored disks or even the index hole.

Commodore also elected to use GCR recording (although a different variation not compatible with Apple's format) in their disk drive line. Tandy however used industry-standard FM on the TRS-80's disk drives, with stock Shugart SA-400s, and so had a mere 85k of storage.

These early drives read only one side of the disk, leading to the popular budget approach of cutting a second write-enable slot and index hole into the carrier envelope and flipping it over (thus, the “flippy disk”) to use the other side for additional storage. This was considered risky by some as single sided disks were only certified by the manufacturer for single-sided use. The reasoning was that, when flipped, the disk would spin in the opposite direction inside its cover, so some of the dirt that had been collected by the fabric lining in the previous rotations would be picked up by the disk and dragged past the read/write head.

Although hard sectored disks were used on some early 8" drives prior to the IBM 33FD (May 1973), they were never widely used in 5¼-inch form, although North Star clung to the format until they went bankrupt in 1984.

Tandon introduced a double-sided drive in 1978, doubling the capacity, and this new “double sided double density” (DSDD) format increased capacity to 360 KB.

By 1979, there were also 77-track 5¼-inch drives available, mostly used in CP/M and other professional computers, and also found in some of Commodore's disk drive line.

By the early 1980s, falling prices of computer hardware and technological advances led to the near-universal adoption of soft sector, double density disk formats. In addition, more compact half-height disk drives began to appear, as well as double-sided drives, although the cost of them meant that single-sided remained the standard for most home computers, and 80-track drives known as "quad density".

For most of the 1970s and 1980s, the floppy drive was the primary storage device for word processors and microcomputers. Since these machines had no hard drive, the OS was usually booted from one floppy disk, which was then removed and replaced by another one containing the application. Some machines using two disk drives (or one dual drive) allowed the user to leave the OS disk in place and simply change the application disks as needed, or to copy data from one floppy to another. In the early 1980s, “quad density” 96-track-per-inch drives appeared, increasing the capacity to 720 KB. RX50 was another proprietary format, used by Digital Equipment Corporation's Rainbow 100, DECmate II, and Professional 300 Series. It held 400 KB on a single side by using 96 tracks per inch and cramming 10 sectors per track.

Floppy disks were supported on IBM's PC DOS and Microsoft's MS-DOS from their beginning on the original IBM PC. With version 1.0 of PC DOS (1981), only single-sided 160 KB floppies were supported. Version 1.1 the next year saw support expand to double-sided 320 KB disks. Finally, in 1983, DOS 2.0 supported 9 sectors per track rather than 8, providing 180 KB on a (formatted) single-sided disk and 360 KB on a double-sided.

In 1984, IBM introduced the 5¼ high density disk format with its new IBM AT machines. The 5¼ HD drive was essentially a scaled-down 8" drive, using the same rotation speed and bit rate, and it provided almost three times as much storage as the 360k format, but had compatibility issues with the older drives due to the narrower read/write head.

Except for labeling, 5¼-inch high-density disks were externally identical to their double-density counterparts. This led to an odd situation wherein the drive itself was unable to determine the density of the disk inserted except by reading the disk media to determine the format. It was therefore possible to use a high-density drive to format a double-density disk to the higher capacity. This usually appeared to work (sometimes reporting a small number of bad sectors)—at least for a time. The problem was that the high-density format was made possible by the creation of a new high-coercivity oxide coating (after soft sector formatting became standard, previous increases in density were largely enabled by improvements in head technology; up until that point, the media formulation had essentially remained the same since 1976). In order to format or write to this high-coercivity media, the high-density drive switched its heads into a mode using a stronger magnetic field. When these stronger fields were written onto a double-density disk (having lower coercivity media), the strongly magnetized oxide particles would begin to affect the magnetic charge of adjacent particles. The net effect is that the disk would begin to erase itself. On the other hand, the opposite procedure (attempting to format an HD disk as DD) would fail almost every time, as the high-coercivity media would not retain data written by the low-power DD field. High-density 3½-inch disks avoided this problem by the addition of a hole in the disk cartridge so that the drive could determine the appropriate density. However, the coercivity rating between the 3½-inch DD and HD formats, 665 and 720 oersteds, is much narrower than that for the -inch format, 600 versus 300 oersteds, and consequently it was possible to format a 3½-inch DD disk as HD with no apparent problems.

By the end of the 1980s, the 5¼-inch disks had been superseded by the 3½-inch disks. Though 5¼-inch drives were still available, as were disks, they faded in popularity as the 1990s began. The main community of users was primarily those who still owned 1980s legacy machines (PCs running DOS or home computers) that had no 3½-inch drive; the advent of Windows 95 (not even sold in stores in a 5¼-inch version; a coupon had to be obtained and mailed in) and subsequent phaseout of stand-alone MS-DOS with version 6.22 forced many of them to upgrade their hardware. On most new computers, the 5¼-inch drives were optional equipment. By the mid-1990s, the drives had virtually disappeared as the 3½-inch disk became the predominant floppy disk.

The "Twiggy" disk 

During the development of the Apple Lisa, Apple developed a disk format codenamed Twiggy, and officially known as FileWare. While basically similar to a standard -inch disk, the Twiggy disk had an additional set of write windows on the top of the disk with the label running down the side. The drive was also present in prototypes of the original Apple Macintosh computer, but was removed in both the Mac and later versions of the Lisa in favor of the -inch floppy disk from Sony. The drives were notoriously unreliable and Apple was criticized for needlessly diverging from industry standards.

The 3-inch compact floppy disk 
Throughout the early 1980s, the limitations of the -inch format were starting to become clear. Originally designed to be smaller and more practical than the 8-inch format, the -inch system was itself too large, and as the quality of the recording media grew, the same amount of data could be placed on a smaller surface. Another problem was that the -inch disks were simply scaled down versions of the 8-inch disks, which had never really been engineered for ease of use. The thin folded-plastic shell allowed the disk to be easily damaged through bending, and allowed dirt to get onto the disk surface through the opening.

A number of solutions were developed, with drives at 2-inch, -inch, 3-inch and -inch (50, 60, 75 and 90 mm), all being offered by various companies. They all shared a number of advantages over the older format, including a small form factor and a rigid case with a slideable write protect catch. The almost-universal use of the -inch format made it very difficult for any of these new formats to gain any significant market share. Some of these formats included Dysan and Shugart's -inch floppy disk, the later ubiquitous Sony -inch disk and the 3-inch format:
 the Amdek AmDisk-3 Micro-Floppy-disk cartridge system in December 1982, which was originally designed for use with the Apple II Disk II interface card
 the Mitsumi Quick Disk 3-inch floppies.

The 3-inch floppy drive itself was manufactured by Hitachi, Matsushita and Maxell. Only Teac outside this "network" is known to have produced drives. Similarly, only three manufacturers of media (Maxell, Matsushita and Tatung) are known (sometimes also branded Yamaha, Amsoft, Panasonic, Schneider, Tandy, Godexco and Dixons), but "no-name" disks with questionable quality have been seen in circulation.

Amstrad included a 3-inch single-sided, double-density (180 KB) drive in their CPC and some models of PCW. The PCW 8512 included a double-sided, quad-density (720 KB) drive as the second drive, and later models, such as the PCW 9512, used quad-density even for the first drive. The single-sided double density (180 KB) drive was "inherited" by the ZX Spectrum +3 computer after Amstrad bought the rights from Sinclair. The Oric-1 and Atmos systems from Oric International also used the 3-inch floppy drives, originally shipping with the Atmos, but also supported on the older Oric-1.

Since all 3-inch media were double-sided in nature, single-sided drive owners were able to flip the disk over to use the other side. The sides were termed "A" and "B" and were completely independent, but single-sided drive units could only access the upper side at one time.

The disk format itself had no more capacity than the more popular (and cheaper) -inch floppies. Each side of a double-density disk held 180 KB for a total of 360 KB per disk, and 720 KB for quad-density disks. Unlike -inch or -inch disks, the 3-inch disks were designed to be reversible and sported two independent write-protect switches. It was also more reliable thanks to its hard casing.

3-inch drives were also used on a number of exotic and obscure CP/M systems such as the Tatung Einstein and occasionally on MSX systems in some regions. Other computers to have used this format are the more unknown Gavilan Mobile Computer and Matsushita's National Mybrain 3000. The Yamaha MDR-1 also used 3-inch drives.

The main problems with this format were the high price, due to the quite elaborate and complex case mechanisms. However, the final tip of the scale was when Sony in 1984 convinced Apple Computer to use the -inch drives in the Macintosh 128K model, effectively making the -inch drive a de facto standard.

Mitsumi's "Quick Disk" 3-inch floppies 

Another 3-inch (75 mm) format was Mitsumi's Quick Disk format. The Quick Disk format is referred to in various size references: 2.8-inch, 3-inch×3-inch and 3-inch×4-inch. Mitsumi offered this as OEM equipment, expecting their VAR customers to customize the packaging for their own particular use; disks thus vary in storage capacity and casing size. The Quick Disk uses a 2.8-inch magnetic media, break-off write-protection tabs (one for each side), and contains a see-through hole near center spindle (used to ensure spindle clamping). Nintendo packaged the 2.8-inch magnetic media in a 3-inch×4-inch housing, while others packaged the same media in a 3 inch×3 inch square housing.

The Quick Disk's most successful use was in Nintendo's Famicom Disk System (FDS). The FDS package of Mitsumi's Quick Disk used a 3-inch×4-inch plastic housing called the "Disk Card". Most FDS disks did not have cover protection to prevent media contamination, but a later special series of five games did include a protective shutter.

Mitsumi's "3-inch" Quick Disk media were also used in a 3-inch×3-inch housing for many Smith Corona word processors. The Smith Corona disks are confusingly labeled "DataDisk 2.8-inch", presumably referring to the size of the medium inside the hard plastic case.

The Quick Disk was also used in several MIDI keyboards and MIDI samplers of the mid-1980s. A non-inclusive list includes: the Roland S-10 and MKS100 samplers, the Korg SQD1, the Korg SQD8 MIDI sequencer, Akai's 1985 model MD280 drive for the S-612 MIDI sampler, Akai's X7000 / S700 (rack version) and X3700, the Roland S-220, and the Yamaha MDF1 MIDI disk drive (intended for their DX7/21/100/TX7 synthesizers, RX11/21/21L drum machines, and QX1, QX21 and QX5 MIDI sequencers).

As the cost in the 1980s to add -inch drives was still quite high, the Mitsumi Quick Disk was competing as a lower cost alternative packaged in several now obscure 8-bit computer systems. Another non-inclusive list of Quick Disk versions: QDM-01, QDD (Quick Disk Drive) on French Thomson micro-computers, in the Casio QD-7 drive, in a peripheral for the Sharp MZ-700 & MZ-800 system, in the DPQ-280 Quickdisk for the Daewoo/Dynadata MSX1 DPC-200, in the Dragon 32/64 machine, in the Crescent Quick Disk 128, 128i and 256 peripherals for the ZX Spectrum, and in the Triton Quick Disk peripheral also for the ZX Spectrum.

The World of Spectrum FAQ reveals that the drives did come in different sizes: 128 to 256 kB in Crescent's incarnation, and in the Triton system, with a density of 4410 bits per inch, data transmission rate of 101.6 kbit/s, a 2.8-inch double sided disk type and a capacity of up to 20 sectors per side at 2.5 kB per sector, up to 100 kB per disk. Quick Disk as used in the Famicom Disk System holds 64 kB of data per side, requiring a manual turn-over to access the second side.

Unusually, the Quick Disk utilizes "a continuous linear tracking of the head and thus creates a single spiral track along the disk similar to a record groove." This has led some to compare it more to a "tape-stream" unit than typically what is thought of as a random-access disk drive.

-inch format 

In 1981, Sony introduced their -inch floppy disk cartridge (90.0 mm × 94.0 mm) having a single sided unformatted capacity of 218.8 KB and a formatted capacity of 161.2 KB. A double sided version was available in 1982. This initial Sony design was similar to other less than -inch designs but somewhat simpler in construction. The first computer to use this format was Sony's SMC-70 of 1982. Other than Hewlett-Packard's HP-150 of 1983 and Sony's MSX computers that year, this format suffered from a similar fate as the other new formats; the -inch format simply had too much market share.

Things changed dramatically in 1982 when the Microfloppy Industry Committee (MIC), a consortium ultimately of 23 media companies, agreed upon a -inch media specification based upon but differing from the original Sony design. The first single-sided drives compatible with this new media specification shipped in early 1983, followed immediately in 1984 by double-sided compatible versions. In 1984, Apple Computer selected the format for their new Macintosh computers. Then, in 1985, Atari adopted it for their new ST line, and Commodore for their new Amiga. By 1988, the -inch was outselling the -inch. In South Africa, the -inch format was generally called a stiffy disk, to distinguish it from the flexible -inch format.

The term "-inch" or "3.5-inch" disk is and was rounded from the 90 mm actual dimension of one side of the rectangular cartridge.

The -inch disks had, by way of their rigid case's slide-in-place metal cover, the significant advantage of being much better protected against unintended physical contact with the disk surface than -inch disks when the disk was handled outside the disk drive. When the disk was inserted, a part inside the drive moved the metal cover aside, giving the drive's read/write heads the necessary access to the magnetic recording surfaces. Adding the slide mechanism resulted in a slight departure from the previous square outline. The irregular, rectangular shape had the additional merit that it made it impossible to insert the disk sideways by mistake as had indeed been possible with earlier formats.

3.5" drives included several other advantages over the older drive types, including not requiring a terminating resistor pack, and no need of an index hole.

The shutter mechanism was not without its problems, however. On old or roughly treated disks, the shutter could bend away from the disk. This made it vulnerable to being ripped off completely (which does not damage the disk itself but does leave it much more vulnerable to dust), or worse, catching inside a drive and possibly either getting stuck inside or damaging the drive.

Evolution 
Like the -inch, the -inch disk underwent an evolution of its own. When Apple introduced the Macintosh in 1984, it used single-sided -inch disk drives with an advertised capacity of 400 KB. The encoding technique used by these drives was known as GCR, or Group Coded Recording (similar recording methods were used by Commodore on its -inch drives and Sirius Systems Technology in its Victor 9000 non-PC-compatible MS-DOS machine).

Higher capacities
Somewhat later, PC-compatible machines began using single-sided -inch disks with an advertised capacity of 360 KB (the same as a double-sided -inch disk), and a different, incompatible recording format called MFM (Modified Frequency Modulation). GCR and MFM drives (and their formatted disks) were incompatible, although the physical disks were the same. In 1986, Apple introduced double-sided, 800 KB disks, still using GCR, and soon after, IBM began using 720 KB double-sided double-density MFM disks in PCs like the IBM PC Convertible. IBM PC compatibles adopted it too, while the Amiga used MFM encoding on the same disks to give a capacity of 1 MB (880 KB available once formatted).

HD
An MFM-based, "high-density" format, displayed as "HD" on the disks themselves and typically advertised as "1.44 MB" was introduced in 1987; the most common formatted capacity was 1,474,560 bytes (or 1440 KiB), double that of the 720 KiB variant. The term "1.44 MB" is a misnomer caused by dividing the size of 1440 kibibytes (1440 * 1024 bytes) by 1000, thus converting 1440 KiB to "1.44 MB" - where the MB stands for neither a megabyte (1,000,000 bytes) nor a mebibyte (1,048,576 bytes) but instead 1,024,000 bytes. Correctly dividing 1440 KiB by 1024 gives a size of 1.40625 MiB. These HD disks had an extra hole in the case on the opposite side of the write-protect notch. IBM used this format on their PS/2 series introduced in 1987. Apple started using "HD" in 1988, on the Macintosh IIx, and the HD floppy drive soon became universal on virtually all Macintosh and PC hardware. Apple's FDHD (Floppy Disk High Density) drive was capable of reading and writing both GCR and MFM formatted disks, and thus made it relatively easy to exchange files with PC users. Apple later marketed this drive as the SuperDrive. Amiga included "HD" floppy drives relatively late, with releasing of Amiga 4000 in 1992, and was able to store 1760 KB on it, with ability in software to read/write PC's 1440 KB/720 KB formats.

ED
Another advance in the oxide coatings allowed for a new "extra-high density" ("ED") format at 2880 KB introduced in 1990 on the NeXTcube, NeXTstation and IBM PS/2 model 57. However, by this time the increased capacity was too small an advance over the HD format and it never became widely used.

See also 
 Floppy disk variants
 History of hard disk drives
 History of IBM magnetic disk drives
 List of floppy disk formats

Notes

References 

Floppy disk
Floppy disk computer storage
 History
Floppy disk